This page is a complete chronological listing of VFL Women's premiers.

List of premiers
The following is a list of premiers and the grand final results.

Premierships by team
This table summarises all premierships won by each team.

Updated to the end of the 2022 season.

Premiership frequency
The 2021 season is not included in the latter three columns, as the season was not fully contested and no premiership was awarded. The cancelled 2020 season is also not included in these columns or the seasons column.

Updated to the end of the 2022 season.

References

Sources

 

Premiers
Premiers
Women's Australian rules football-related lists